Martin Francis Loughlin (March 11, 1923 – March 7, 2007) was a United States district judge of the United States District Court for the District of New Hampshire.

Education and career

Loughlin was born in Manchester, New Hampshire and graduated with an Artium Baccalaureus degree from Saint Anselm College in 1947 and received a Bachelor of Laws from Suffolk University Law School in 1951. During World War II Loughlin served in the 80th Division of the United States Army under General George S. Patton from 1943 to 1946. He served as a Judge Advocate (JAG) during the Korean War from 1951 to 1952, stationed at Fort Benning in Georgia. He engaged in private practice in Manchester from 1953 to 1963. From 1963 to 1978, Loughlin served as an associate justice of the New Hampshire Superior Court, and was chief justice from 1978 to 1979.

Federal judicial service

Loughlin was nominated to the United States District Court for the District of New Hampshire by President Jimmy Carter on February 9, 1979, to a new seat created by 92 Stat. 1629.  He was confirmed by the United States Senate on April 24, 1979, and received his commission on April 26, 1979. Loughlin assumed senior status due to a certified disability on May 15, 1989, and his service terminated on December 4, 1995, due to retirement.

Death

Loughlin died on March 7, 2007, in Manchester from congestive heart failure. He was survived by his wife of 56 years, Margaret Gallagher Loughlin and seven children.

References

Sources
 

1923 births
2007 deaths
People from Manchester, New Hampshire
New Hampshire state court judges
Saint Anselm College alumni
Suffolk University Law School alumni
United States Army officers
United States Army personnel of World War II
Judges of the United States District Court for the District of New Hampshire
United States district court judges appointed by Jimmy Carter
20th-century American judges
Superior court judges in the United States